The Exmoor Horn is a white faced, horned breed of sheep. It was developed in Exmoor, Devon, in the 19th century, but is a descendant of sheep that had roamed on the moors for several hundred years.

Research by the Exmoor National Park has found that numbers have gradually declined: it estimates that in 1947 over 27% of sheep in the Somerset part of Exmoor were pure bred Exmoor Horns. As the number of sheep in the region has increased, so the percentage has dropped, and today breeding Exmoor Horn ewes represent only about 10% of the total on Exmoor. The National Park reports that there are about 19,000 registered breeding ewes today, of which around 15,000 are on Exmoor. Small numbers are also found on neighbouring Dartmoor.

Exmoors are a hardy breed, so well suited to the high moors. They are ‘dual purpose’ - bred not just for their wool, but also for the fact that they are prolific sheep and good mothers, producing quality lamb.

References

External links
 Exmoor Horn Sheep Breeders’ Society
 Exmoor Horn , Oklahoma State University, Dept. of Animal Science

Sheep breeds
Sheep breeds originating in England